Risso's dolphin  (Grampus griseus) is a dolphin, the only species of the genus Grampus. Some of the closest related species to these dolphins include: pilot whales (Globicephala spp.), pygmy killer whales (Feresa attenuata), melon-headed whales (Peponocephala electra), and false killer whales (Pseudorca crassidens).

Taxonomy
Risso's dolphin is named after Antoine Risso, whose study of the animal formed the basis of the recognised description by Georges Cuvier in 1812.  The holotype referred to specimen at the Muséum National d'Histoire Naturelle, an exhibit using preserved skin and skull obtained at Brest, France.

The type and sole species of the genus Grampus refers to Delphinus griseus Cuvier 1812. A proposition to name this genus Grampidelphis in 1933, when the taxonomic status of 'blackfish' was uncertain, and conserving the extensive use of "Grampus" for the 'killer' Orcinus orca", also suggested renaming this species (Grampidelphis exilis Iredale, T. & Troughton, E. le G. 1933). These were recognised as synonyms after publication of the Catalog of Whales (Hershkovitz, 1966).

Another common name for the Risso's dolphin is grampus (also the species' genus), although this common name was more often used for the orca. The etymology of the word "grampus" is unclear. It may be an agglomeration of the Latin grandis piscis or French grand poisson, both meaning big fish. The specific epithet griseus refers to the mottled (almost scarred) grey colour of its body.

Description

Risso's dolphin has a relatively large anterior body and dorsal fin, while the posterior tapers to a relatively narrow tail. The bulbous shape of the head has a vertical crease in front.

Infants are dorsally grey to brown and ventrally cream-colored, with a white anchor-shaped area between the pectorals and around the mouth. In older calves, the nonwhite areas darken to nearly black, and then lighten (except for the always dark dorsal fin). Linear scars mostly from social interaction eventually cover the bulk of the body; scarring is a common feature of male to male competition in toothed whales, but Risso's dolphin tend to be unusually heavily scarred. The pronounced appearance of these scars results from the lack of repigmentation, which may be advantageous as a display that reduces further challenges from other males. Older individuals appear mostly white. Most individuals have two to seven pairs of teeth, all in the lower jaw.

Length is typically , although specimens may reach . Like most dolphins, males are typically slightly larger than females. This species weighs , making it the largest species called "dolphin".

Range and habitat

Risso's dolphins are found worldwide in temperate and tropical waters, in the Indian, Pacific and Atlantic Oceans, also the Persian Gulf, Mediterranean and Red Seas, but not the Black Sea (a stranding was recorded in the Sea of Marmara in 2012). They range as far north as the Gulf of Alaska and southern Greenland and as far south as Tierra del Fuego.

They are recorded diving to depths of 600 metres in pursuit of prey.

The population around the continental shelf of the United States is estimated to be in excess of 60,000. In the Pacific, a census recorded 175,000 individuals in eastern tropical waters and 85,000 in the west. No global estimate exists.

Ecology

They feed almost exclusively on neritic and oceanic squid, mostly nocturnally. Predation does not appear significant. Mass strandings are infrequent. Analysis carried out on the stomach contents of stranded specimens in Scotland showed that the most important species preyed on in Scottish waters is the curled octopus (Eledone cirrhosa).

A population is found off Santa Catalina Island where they are sympatric with short-finned pilot whales (Globicephala macrorhynchus) and both species feed on the squid population. Although these species have not been seen to interact with each other, they take advantage of the commercial squid fishing that takes place at night. They have been seen by fishermen to feed around their boats. They also travel with other cetaceans. They surf the bow waves of gray whales, as well as ocean swells.

Risso's dolphins have a stratified social organisation. These dolphins typically travel in groups of between 10 and 51, but can sometimes form "super-pods" reaching up to a few thousand individuals. Smaller, stable subgroups exist within larger groups. These groups tend to be similar in age or sex. Risso's experience fidelity towards their groups. Long-term bonds are seen to correlate with adult males. Younger individuals experience less fidelity and can leave and join groups. Mothers show a high fidelity towards a group of mother and calves, but it is unclear whether or not these females stay together after their calves leave or remain in their natal pods.

Behavior

Feeding
Like many dolphin species, they use echolocation to target cephalapods and fish that are feeding below. Tagging of a population in the Azores revealed that Grampus griseus plan whether to make a shallow or deep dive, with different strategies that create profitable foraging for the considerable expenditure in time and energy. Risso's can achieve depths over 600 metres by exhausting their lungs and using several spins to rapidly descend, almost vertically, and increase the time spent foraging. This allows the species to exploit a deep and dispersed layer of prey such as squid, those taking refuge during daylight when they become more vulnerable to predation.

Social behavior
Risso's dolphins do not require cutting teeth to process their cephalopod prey, which has allowed the species to evolve teeth as display weapons in mating conflicts.

Reproduction

Gestation requires an estimated 13–14 months, at intervals of 2.4 years. Calving reaches seasonal peaks in the winter in the eastern Pacific and in the summer and fall in the western Pacific. Females mature sexually at ages 8–10, and males at age 10–12. The oldest specimen reached 39.6 years.

Risso's dolphins have successfully been taken into captivity in Japan and the United States, although not with the regularity of bottlenose dolphins or orcas. Hybrid Risso's-bottlenose dolphins have been bred in captivity.

Human interactions 
Like other dolphins and marine animals, there have been documentations of these dolphins getting caught in seine-nets and gillnets across the globe. Many of these incidents have resulted in death. Small whaling operations have also been cause of some of these deaths. Pollution has also affected many individuals who have ingested plastic. Samples from these animals shows contamination within their tissue.

In Ireland, though not apparently in England, Risso's Dolphin was one of the royal fish which by virtue of the royal prerogative were the exclusive property of the English Crown.

A famed individual named Pelorus Jack was widely reported between 1888 and 1912, travelling with ships navigating the Cook Strait in New Zealand. A law protecting the animal was passed after a public outcry, renewed twice more, but suggested be invalid by its reference to Fisheries acts that did not concern marine mammals.

Conservation
The Risso's dolphin populations of the North, Baltic, and Mediterranean Seas are listed on Appendix II of the Convention on the Conservation of Migratory Species of Wild Animals (CMS), since they have an unfavourable conservation status or would benefit significantly from international co-operation organised by tailored agreements.

In addition, Risso's dolphin is covered by the Agreement on the Conservation of Small Cetaceans of the Baltic, North East Atlantic, Irish and North Seas (ASCOBANS), the Agreement on the Conservation of Cetaceans in the Black Sea, Mediterranean Sea and Contiguous Atlantic Area (ACCOBAMS), the Memorandum of Understanding for the Conservation of Cetaceans and Their Habitats in the Pacific Islands Region (Pacific Cetaceans MoU) and the Memorandum of Understanding Concerning the Conservation of the Manatee and Small Cetaceans of Western Africa and Macaronesia (Western African Aquatic Mammals MoU).

Risso's dolphins are protected in the United States under the Marine Mammal Protection Act of 1992.  Currently, Japan, Indonesia, the Solomon Islands, and The Lesser Antilles hunt Risso's dolphins.

Strandings
At least one case report of strandings in Japan's Goto Islands has been associated with parasitic neuropathy of the eighth cranial nerve by a trematode in the genus Nasitrema. There was a recent reporting of a juvenile male Risso's dolphin that was stranded alive on the coast of Gran Canaria on 26 April 2019. This was the first documented case of capture myopathy and stress cardiomyopathy in a male juvenile Risso's dolphin that has received rehabilitation.

References

Further reading
National Audubon Society Guide to Marine Mammals of the World 
Encyclopedia of Marine Mammals 
Whales, Dolphins and Porpoises, Mark Carwardine,

External links

Whale and Dolphin Conservation Society
ARKive Photographs, video
Voices in the Sea – Sound of the Risso's Dolphin
 

Risso's dolphin
Cosmopolitan mammals
Risso's dolphin
Risso's dolphin